Kaler is a block of Arwal district, Bihar state, India. It consist of 15 panchayats. NH139 passes through it.

References

Cities and towns in Arwal district